Ponderia magna is a species of sea snail, a marine gastropod mollusk in the family Muricidae, the murex snails or rock snails.

Description

Distribution
This marine species occurs in the Coral Sea..

References

 Merle D., Garrigues B. & Pointier J.-P. (2011) Fossil and Recent Muricidae of the world. Part Muricinae. Hackenheim: Conchbooks. 648 pp.

External links
 Houart, R.; Héros, V. (2012). New species of Muricidae (Gastropoda) and additional or noteworthy records from the western Pacific. Zoosystema. 34(1), 21-37

Muricidae
Gastropods described in 1988